Can-Am League is the nickname of two baseball leagues:

 Canadian American Association of Professional Baseball (2004–2019), an independent league.
 Canadian–American League (1936–1951), a class C minor league.

It may also refer to:
 Canadian–American Hockey League, a minor ice hockey league that played from 1926 to 1936.